Islampur Assembly constituency is an assembly constituency in Uttar Dinajpur district in the Indian state of West Bengal.

Overview
As per orders of the Delimitation Commission, No. 29 Islampur Assembly constituency covers Islampur municipality, and Agdimti Khanti, Gaisal I, Gaisal II, Gunjaria, Islampur, Matikunda I, Matikunda II, Panditpota I, Panditpota II, Ramganj I and Ramganj II gram panchayats of Islampur community development block.

Islampur Assembly constituency is part of No. 5 Raiganj (Lok Sabha constituency). It was earlier part of Darjeeling (Lok Sabha constituency)

Members of Legislative Assembly

Election results

2021 election

2019 by-election

2016

2011
In the 2011 election, Abdul Karim Chowdhury of Trinamool Congress defeated his nearest rival Sayeda Farhat Afroz of CPI(M).

 

Kanaia Lal Agarwal, Chairman of Islampur municipality, run by the Congress, was the rebel Congress candidate who contested as an Independent from Islampur.  He was suspended from the party but the Raiganj MP, Deepa Dasmunsi, campaigned for him.

.# Swing calculated on Trinamool Congress and CPI(M) vote percentages, as there was a rebel Congress candidate.

1977-2006
In the 2006 state assembly elections, Md. Faruque of CPI(M) won the Islampur assembly constituency defeating his nearest rival Abdul Karim Chowdhary of Trinamool Congress. Contests in most years were multi cornered but only winners and runners are being mentioned. Abdul Karim Chowdhary representing Trinamool Congress in 2001 and Congress in 1996 and 1991 defeated Md. Faruque Azam of CPI(M). Md. Faruque Azam of CPI(M) defeated Abdul Karim Chowdhary of Congress in 1987. Abdul Karim Chowdhary of Congress/ Independent defeated Md. Faiukazam of CPI(M) in 1982 and Goutam Gupta, Independent, in 1977.

1951
Although Islampur constituency was formed in West Bengal in 1977, it was a constituency in independent India's first election in 1951, when the area was part of Bihar. Chowdhary Mohamad Afaque of Congress won the Islampur seat in 1951.

See also 
 Bengali language Movement (North Dinajpur)

References

Assembly constituencies of West Bengal
Politics of Uttar Dinajpur district